Moayad Hassan Fedaily (born 28 January 1992) is a Qatari football player. He currently plays for Al-Gharafa in the Qatar Stars League

International career

International goals
Scores and results list Qatar's goal tally first.

References

Living people
1992 births
Qatari footballers
Qatar international footballers
Al-Gharafa SC players
Qatar Stars League players
Association football wingers